Thomas Addison Richards (December 3, 1820 – June 28, 1900), was an American landscape artist.

Biography
Richards was born in London, UK, and migrated with his family to the United States in 1831. The family first settled in New York, then South Carolina. By 1837 they were in Georgia, where Richards began his career preparing sketches of Georgia scenery. His first book, Georgia Illustrated, appeared in 1841. He was associated with the short-lived periodical The Orion.  His subsequent works including American Scenery in 1854, The Romance of American Landscape and Guide to Central Park and a number of other works of landscape and travel. Richards sometimes collaborated with his brother William Carey Richards, also an artist and sometimes lecturer who linked fine art and science.

He died at his nephew's home in Annapolis, Maryland on June 28, 1900.

References

External links
 

1820 births
1900 deaths
American landscape painters
19th-century American painters
19th-century American male artists
American male painters
Artists from London
English emigrants to the United States
Painters from Georgia (U.S. state)